Pat Fitzgerald (born 7 May 1936) is  a former Australian rules footballer who played with Footscray in the Victorian Football League (VFL).

Notes

External links 		
		
		
		
		
		

1936 births
Living people
Australian rules footballers from Victoria (Australia)		
Western Bulldogs players
Sunshine Football Club (VFA) players